Journal of Animal and Feed Sciences is an open access peer-reviewed scientific journal of animal and agricultural science. The journal has been published by the Kielanowski Institute of Animal Physiology and Nutrition of the Polish Academy of Sciences (Jabłonna, Poland) since 1992. It continues the earlier Polish-language Roczniki nauk rolniczych. Seria B: Zootechniczna. It publishes original papers, reviews and, occasionally, short papers on basic and applied research. The journal was edited by Jan Kowalczyk (1991–2013), Jacek Skomiał (2014–2020), Agata Krawczyńska (2021) and since 2022 is edited by Anna Antuszewicz.

Abstracting and indexing 
The journal is abstracted and indexed in:

According to the Journal Citation Reports, the journal has a 2020 impact factor of 1.525.

External links 
 Journal of Animal and Feed Sciences (JAFS)
 The Kielanowski Institute of Animal Physiology and Nutrition, Polish Academy of Sciences (Jabłonna, Poland)

References

Publications established in 1992
Animal science journals
English-language journals